Tourism in Ghana is regulated by the Ministry of Tourism of Ghana. This ministry is responsible for the development and promotion of tourism related activities in Ghana.

Tourist attractions and tourism statistics

Tourist arrivals to Ghana include visitors from South and Latin America, Asia and Europe. Tourists come to Ghana to enjoy its all year round tropical warm climate and its wildlife. Ghana boasts waterfalls (such as Kintampo Waterfalls and the largest waterfall in West Africa, the Tagbo Falls, Ghana's palm-lined sandy beaches, caves, mountains, rivers, meteorite impact crater. Other attractions include reservoirs and lakes such as Lake Bosumtwi or Bosumtwi meteorite crater and the largest man-made lake in the world by surface area, Lake Volta. Ghana also has dozens of castles and forts, UNESCO World Heritage Sites, nature reserves and national parks.

The World Economic Forum statistics in 2010 showed that Ghana was 108th out of 139 countries as the world's favourite tourism destinations. The country had moved two places up from the 2009 rankings. In 2011, Forbes Magazine, published that Ghana was ranked the eleventh-most friendly country in the world. The assertion was based on a survey in 2010 of a cross-section of travellers. Of all the African countries that were included in the survey Ghana ranked highest.

In 2011, Ghana made $2.19 billion ($2,019,000,000) from the tourism sector from an estimated 1.1 million international tourist arrivals. In 2012, Ghana’s tourism sector made $1.7 billion from 993,600 international tourists, providing employment for 359,000 people. Ghana will annually make US$8.3 billion from the tourism sector per year by the year 2027 on the back of an estimated 4.3 million international tourist arrivals.

To enter Ghana, it is necessary to have a visa authorized by the Government of Ghana, except for certain business incubators and business magnates who are on business trips.

Heritage tourism 
Heritage tourism in Ghana is led by a festival called the Pan-African Historical Festival or PANAFEST. The festival is a cultural event with the intention of increasing the notion of Pan-Africanism and African development. It consists of the festival itself as well as the celebration surrounding Emancipation Day. PANAFEST primarily takes place in two cities, Elmina and Cape Coast, which were the largest slave-trading forts in the nation. The festival takes place over eight to nine days and begins with a ceremonial wreath laying. Events during PANAFEST include carnival day, a journey of return from those located in other nations, Rita Marley's birthday, an academic lecture on the women and youth, a naming ceremony from people from the diaspora, and finally the "Reverential Night".

PANAFEST is a direct manifestation of Ghanaian culture. It is also the appropriation of it and capitalization by the Rawlings administration. Indeed, Rawlings' developed international cultural festivals such as PANAFEST as a source of income for Ghana through the promotion of tourism in Ghana. It proved to be effective.

Tourism in Ghana: appropriated beginnings 
Before the Jerry Rawlings administration in 1981, tourism in Ghana was not an effective source of income for the Ghanaian society and was thus a missed opportunity in helping to diversify the Ghanaian economy. The Rawlings administration saw this area of opportunity and capitalized on it, ultimately appropriating the Ghanaian culture and utilizing it as a source of revenue. Through the restoration of castles that were once used for the slave industry, establishment of public memorials honouring the "illustrious sons" of Ghana coupled with encouragement from the government via incentives for private investments, the Rawlings administration was effectively able to push tourism forward with the cost of capitalizing on Ghanaian culture.

The tourist industry in Ghana is known to promote sustainable tourism that includes: cultural tourism, heritage tourism, recreational tourism, adventure tourism and events tourism. Cultural tourism focuses on festivals and events, whereas heritage tourism focuses on the history of the slave routes. Recreational tourism allows tourists to explore beaches and theme parks. Adventure tourism takes a look at rain forests and game parks, and event tourism focuses on resources and conferences.

Many of the heritage tourism sites highlight the legacy of the African Diaspora and the social composition of communities. As a result, these studies have impacted the tourists' connection to the heritage tourism sites by providing cultural depth to their travelling experience.

Currency in Ghana and exchange rates 
In Ghana, the economic system is based on the Ghanaian Cedi (currency symbol GH¢) and the Pesewa (currency symbol Gp). Pesewas are the basic units of Ghanaian currency and cedis are the second tier in their economic system; in other words, pesewas are comparable to the United States' penny and the cedi is comparable to a United States dollar. Although they may be compared in that regard, currency in Ghana is of lower denomination than currency in the United States. 1 Ghanaian Cedi converts to approximately 18¢ in the United States.

Cost of daily necessities/shopping in Ghana 
A popular aspect of traveling is getting to experience the food, culture, and shopping of a new area. Here is a  table that details the cost of items that are frequently bought by tourists in Ghana (currency will be in Ghanaian Cedi). The average taxi is pretty cheap at just about £4.5

Transportation and Traveling in Ghana 
In Ghana, various methods of transportation are used by tourists. The Tro tro is one method of transportation that usually utilizes a minivan and are used to travel anywhere throughout Ghana. Though an uncomfortable mode of transportation due to it being usually packed with passengers, it is still a viable option and the cost is fairly low. The "hurry cars" are private cars that have set destinations and wait for passengers that are going to the set destination of the hurry car. They are typically found by transport  stations and is definitely a more comfortable method of travel as opposed to a Tro Tro. The drivers of hurry cars will usually hold signs or give some type of information letting passengers know the destination they are set to go.

Major tourist sites
Aburi Botanical Gardens 

 Kakum National Park – National Park
 Digya National Park  – National Park
 Mole National Park – National Park
 Ankasa National park – National Park
 Cape Coast Castle – UNESCO World Heritage Site
 Elmina Castle – UNESCO World Heritage Site
 Nzulezo – UNESCO World Heritage Site

Gallery

See also
 Visa policy of Ghana
 Ghana’s material cultural heritage
 Ministry of Tourism (Ghana)
 Transport in Ghana

Notes and references

External links
 
 Official website
 K. Effah, "Ghana Named As One Of Top Travel Destinations", Yen.

 
Ghana